20 Years or Twenty Years may refer to:

20 Years – A Warrior Soul, a video album by Doro Pesch, 2006
Twenty Years (film), a 1949 Italian comedy
"Twenty Years" (song), by Placebo, 2004

See also

20 Años (disambiguation)